Blanche Kiser Taylor Moore (born February 17, 1933) is an American convicted murderer and possible serial killer from Alamance County, North Carolina. Moore is awaiting execution in North Carolina for her boyfriend's 1986 arsenic poisoning. She is also suspected of the death of her father, mother-in-law, and first husband and the attempted murder of her second husband in 1989.

Early life
Blanche Taylor Moore was born Blanche Kiser to Flonnie Blanche (née Honeycutt) and Parker Davis Kiser, a mill-worker, ordained Baptist minister, and womanizer. Her father was an alcoholic, who she said later forced her into prostitution to pay his gambling debts. She was known to switch from quoting Scripture to sexually explicit topics in the same breath. Her father died, reportedly of a heart attack, in 1966.

Murders and attempted murder
On May 29, 1952, she married James Napoleon Taylor, a veteran and furniture restorer; they had two children, one in 1953 and another in 1959. In 1954, she began working as a cashier at Kroger. By 1959, she had been promoted to head cashier (roughly the equivalent of a customer service manager today), the highest job available to a female employee at Kroger. In 1962, she began an affair with Raymond Reid, the store manager. James Taylor died on October 2, 1973; as with her father seven years earlier (1966), the cause of death was initially reported as a heart attack.

After Taylor's death on October 2, 1973, Moore and Reid began dating publicly. By 1985, however, the relationship had soured. There are indications that she began to date Robert J. Hutton, Kroger's regional manager for the Piedmont Triad area; however, that relationship ended, and she filed a sexual harassment lawsuit against Hutton and Kroger in October 1985. Hutton was forced to resign, and Kroger settled the case out of court two years later for $275,000. In 1985, she also accused an unknown "pervert" of starting two fires that damaged her mobile home.

On Easter Sunday, she met Rev. Dwight Moore, the divorced pastor of the Carolina United Church of Christ in rural Alamance County. Eventually, the two began meeting for meals. Blanche had to hide her budding relationship with Moore because her lawsuit against Kroger maintained that she was "completely alienated and antagonistic towards men and has not been able to maintain any meaningful social contacts with the opposite sex." While she was dating Moore, she asked him to procure some arsenic-based ant killer for her.

In 1986, Reid developed what was initially diagnosed as a case of shingles. He was hospitalized in April of that year and died on October 7, 1986. Doctors indicated the cause of death was Guillain–Barré syndrome. The Kroger lawsuit was settled one year later. Blanche and Moore began seeing each other publicly shortly after Reid's death. They planned to marry, but Blanche was diagnosed with breast cancer in 1987. The wedding date was pushed back to November 1988, but Moore developed a mysterious intestinal ailment that required two surgeries to correct. On April 19, 1989, the couple were married and honeymooned over a long weekend in New Jersey. Within days of their return, Moore became severely ill and collapsed after eating a fast-food chicken sandwich that Blanche had given him.

After several days of extreme nausea and vomiting, Moore was admitted to Alamance County Hospital on April 28. For the next two days, he was transferred between Alamance County and North Carolina Baptist Hospital in Winston-Salem. Moore was then admitted to North Carolina Memorial Hospital in Chapel Hill. Despite hospitalization, his condition deteriorated further, threatening multiple organ failures and death. Moore had told doctors he had been working with herbicide in their yard soon after their honeymoon. Doctors Lucas Wong, Jonathan Serody, Mark Murphy, and George Sanders, after discussions with the hospital toxicologist, ordered a toxicology screen to check for herbicide poisoning. The results came back on March 13, showing Moore had 20 times the lethal dose of arsenic in his system – the most arsenic found in a living patient in the hospital's history. Moore had a particularly robust constitution and survived. However, he never regained full sensation in his hands and feet. In a 2010 television interview, Moore said he still suffers tremors in his hands and weakness in his legs.

The North Carolina State Bureau of Investigation (SBI) and the hospital notified the police of Moore's toxicology results. When interviewed by police from his hospital bed, he mentioned that a former boyfriend of Blanche's died from Guillain–Barré syndrome, which presents similar symptoms to arsenic poisoning. Investigators also discovered Blanche had attempted to change Moore's pension to make herself the principal beneficiary. In light of these revelations, exhumations of her first husband James Taylor, her lover Raymond Reid, and her father Parker Kiser was ordered by investigators. Subsequent autopsies showed elevated levels of arsenic in all three bodies. The levels found in Reid and Taylor were determined to be fatal, therefore reclassifying their deaths as the result of arsenic poisoning. It also emerged that doctors at Baptist Hospital, where Reid was admitted in 1986, had ordered a toxicology screen for him. However, on the day the test came back, the resident responsible for caring for Reid rotated to another hospital, and the new resident never passed the results up the chain of command. Those results had shown an extremely high level of arsenic in Reid's system.

During interviews, Moore stated that both her husband and Reid felt depressed and suggested they had probably been taking arsenic themselves—something investigators found highly improbable. Additionally, it emerged she had still been sleeping with Reid around the same time she began dating Moore, raising further questions about her possible involvement with Reid's illness and death. Blanche also had Moore's hair cut to prevent hair samples from being obtained by the SBI. Pubic hair samples were used instead. On July 18, 1989, Moore was arrested and charged with first-degree murder in the deaths of Reid and Taylor. She was also charged with assault with a deadly weapon for the poisoning of Moore. Prosecutors later dropped the charges in the cases of Taylor and Moore, after she was sentenced to death for Reid's murder.

Trial, conviction and sentence
The trial opened in Winston-Salem on October 21, 1990. Moore adamantly denied ever giving Reid any food. However, the state introduced 53 witnesses who testified about her daily trips to the hospital, bearing food. The state had an easier time making such a complex case because Reid's ex-wife and sons sued Baptist Hospital for malpractice. They were able to get the normal statute of limitations for wrongful death thrown out because they were able to prove that Blanche, as executor of Reid's estate, should have been the person to find out about the toxicology screen. The Reid family argued that Moore fraudulently prevented them from finding out about the test; longstanding precedent in U.S. courts holds that statute limitations do not apply when the defendant engages in fraudulent concealment.

Under the terms of a deal between the Forsyth County district attorney's office and the Reid family's lawyers, most of the evidence against Moore was gathered by the latter party. Although the courts have interpreted the Fifth Amendment protection against self-incrimination very broadly for criminal cases, such protections usually don't apply in civil cases. Civil law also allows much more latitude for searches and subpoenas.

Moore was convicted on November 14, 1990. On November 17, the jury recommended the death penalty. On January 18, 1991, the presiding judge concurred with the jury and sentenced Moore to die by lethal injection. She currently resides at the North Carolina Correctional Institution for Women as prisoner #0288088. She wrote music in the past and spends her time writing poetry. Health issues in prison have required Moore to undergo both chemotherapy and radiation therapy. Because of the automatic appeals in progress, Moore has been able to avoid execution for over 31 years. She maintains her innocence to this day.

One of Moore's attorneys, David Tamer, misappropriated client funds, including hers, and was convicted of embezzlement. He also had a history of psychological problems. In 2010, Moore and the 11 other death row inmates from Forsyth County filed a motion to convert their sentences to life imprisonment based on the state's Racial Justice Act. Essentially, the issue was the racial composition of the juries. Dwight Moore told Winston-Salem station WXII-TV that he has no objections to his ex-wife seeking to have her death sentence overturned.

Book and film
In 1993, author Jim Schutze wrote a book about the murders, entitled Preacher's Girl. Schutze found evidence that seemed to indicate that Moore set up Hutton in the sexual harassment suit, and she may have intentionally set the two fires. Later that year, Elizabeth Montgomery played Moore in the television film based on the book entitled Black Widow Murders: The Blanche Taylor Moore Story.

Episode 66 (Case 66: The Black Widow) of the Casefile True Crime podcast covers the case of Blanche Taylor Moore, including her crimes, the investigation of them, and her trial.

In 1999, the Discovery Channel's The New Detectives series, Season 4, Episode 6, "Women Who Kill", featured Blanche Taylor Moore's crimes. Her crimes were also portrayed in the Evil Lives Here episode "The Black Widow", and the Snapped episode "Blanche Taylor Moore".

In the reenactment segment of the last episode of Season 1 of Deadly Women, Blanche Taylor Moore was portrayed by Maja Meschitschek.

See also
 Velma Barfield – a similar killer who was also from North Carolina
 Stacey Castor
 Judy Buenoano
 Audrey Marie Hilley
 List of death row inmates in the United States
 List of women on death row in the United States

References

External links and references
NC Dept. of Corrections records, showing current status of Blanche Taylor Moore

1933 births
20th-century American criminals
American female murderers
American people convicted of murder
American prisoners sentenced to death
Criminals from North Carolina
Living people
People convicted of murder by North Carolina
People from Concord, North Carolina
Poisoners
Prisoners sentenced to death by North Carolina
Suspected serial killers
Women sentenced to death